Botushë is a village in the municipality of Gjakova, District of Gjakova, southwest Kosovo. It is located near the border with Albania and is part of the Highlands of Gjakova. It is inhabited exclusively by Albanians.

Etymology 
The two forms of this toponym, 'Botushë' and 'Batushë', contain the Albanian reducing suffix -ushë. Amongst the local population, 'Batushë' is favoured. The toponym with an 'a' is related to the Illyro-Dardanian Batoni, an anthroponym of the royal Dardanian family, whereas 'o' would suggest a link with the Albanian  'botë'  which means 'earth, land'. This indicates that the toponym most likely derives from Albanian.

Geography 
Botushë is situated north-west of Gjakova in the historical ethnographic region of the Gjakova Highlands. It is cradled near the Accursed Mountains and is positioned on both banks of the Gusha stream. It is located in the tribal territory of the Gashi tribe – which lies in the historical region of the Highlands of Gjakova – and is inhabited by the members of the aforementioned tribe. It is 23 km away from Gjakova and 3 km away from Junik.

History 
Prehistoric findings have been found on the territory of the village, as well as findings that date back to the Roman period and the Middle Ages – they have been proposed for listing as one of the Monuments of Kosovo. The kulla of Adem Ademaj dates back to the 18th or 19th century, and is on the list. Additionally, the kulla of Rexh Uka, which dates back to the 19th century, is proposed for classification on the same list.

Botushë itself is an old settlement with a well documented history. There are many old Albanian toponyms, such as the following: Fusha e Kishës (The Church's Field), Lluga e Mel Kurtit, Qyteza e Poshtme (Lower Citadel), Qyteza e Epërme (Upper Citadel), Arrabregu (Walnut Hill), Kokorri, Fusha e Mar (k) Bushës (Mark Busha's Field), Kalaja e Jerinës (Jerina Castle), Kalaja e Madhe (Great Castle), Kalaja e Vogël (Little Castle), Shkoza (hornbeam), Shpella e Çelisë (Cave of Çeli), Prroni i Çelisë, Shpati i Valës (Vala's Slope), Arza, Livadhi i Boçit (Boçi's Meadow), Koteci, Kodra Tabe (Tabe Hill) etc. These toponyms reveal that Botushë had possibly been a historically fortified place; the prehistoric layer is seen in Jerina Castle, above Botushë, in the place called Shkozë just southwest of the village. The unexplored Cave of Celi is nearby, and the cases of Late Antiquity belong to the Great Castle and the Little Castle.

Middle ages 
The inhabitants during the late 15th century were Albanian Christians of the Orthodox rite with a Catholic minority. Inhabitants of Botushë were mentioned with Albanian names in 1485, such as `Ulku`. According to the same Ottoman Defter of 1485, Botushë had grown to 35 homes (married household heads), and Morina asserts that the names of the inhabitants of Botushë are of Albanian-Christian and Albanian-Slavic origin.  Sometimes members of the same family would have mixed Albanian-Slavic names, such as in the case of Nenko, son of Leka. A large part of the anthroponomy during Serbian rule shows a degree of slavicisation.

Morina asserts that a chrysobull from the Dečani Monastery indicates that Emperor Stefan Dušan had given the village of Botushë, along with the Church of St. Nicholas which was located in the village to the monastery as property. This chrysobull demonstrates the wider phenomenon of Albanian settlements and their Catholic churches within the Dukagjini area being given to Slav Orthodox churches/monasteries as property for economic utilization. Scholars, in particular Gaspër Gjini, have asserted that many of Kosovo's Catholic churches were seized by Serbian Kings in the Middle Ages and were subsequently gifted to Slav Orthodox churches. Albanian villages were gifted by Serbian kings, particularly Stefan Dušan, as tribute to the Serbian monastery of Deçan, as well as those of Prizren and Tetova. Following the Turkish conquest of the region, Princess Milica of Serbia successfully advocated for the return of Botushë and surrounding villages to the Dečani Monastery from Turkish control.

Ottoman period 
According to local legend, the Gashi tribe took its current form when the Aga of the Gashi in Botushë united the Luzha with the bajrak of Bardhi and Shipshan as a protective measure against the surrounding tribes who were bigger in number. According to legend, Botusha – along with Luzha – are the two villages in the Highlands of Gjakova where the Albanian population of the older Gashi tribe of Pult during the 17th century continues to live. Due to their constant resistance against Ottoman rule, the Gashi tribe were repeatedly punished via military expeditions, which led to the departure of the population from their initial settlements and a gradual conversion to Islam in the years 1690–1743. In Botusha and Deçan, about 10-11 generations of ancestors with Muslim names are remembered, while the previous generations with Catholic names. Both Luzha and Botusha are mentioned by Catholic priests who visited some villages beyond the Diocese of Pult in 1693–1694.

Local Albanian leaders, such as Sulejman Aga of Botushë (who was a chieftain of the Gashi and their leader in the Gjakova region in the early 20th century), organised resistance and movements for independence against the Ottomans throughout the 19th-20th centuries; in one such uprising, 5,000-6,000 Albanian fighters led by Sulejman Aga Batusha, gathered outside of Gjakova and attacked the garrison in an attempt to enter the city.

In 1904, 10 Ottoman battalions accompanied by artillery were sent to Gjakova in order to quell the uprising. Shemsi Pasha and the Ottomans were then ordered to estimate the livestock possessions and to enforce heavy taxes upon the local Albanians in response to the uprising. The hostilities were accompanied by the forcible collection of taxes from the local population and the destruction of entire villages in the Gjakova region by Ottoman forces; upon arriving to Botusha, Shemsi Pasha, with five battalions and numerous artillery pieces, began bombarding the houses. The Ottomans were met by 300 Albanian resistance fighters led by Sulejman Aga Batusha. The resistance fighters lost 35 dead or wounded, but the Ottomans lost more than 80 soldiers. Another 300 Albanian fighters arrived and surrounded the Ottoman force but could not yet finish them as the Ottomans were numerically-superior and were positioned well with artillery. 2,000 Albanian tribesmen would eventually gather to fight the Turks, and the Ottoman government sent 18 more battalions accompanied by artillery to quell this new uprising; Shkup's Vali, Shakir Pasha, also went to Gjakova. A series of ensuing battles followed in the Gjakova region, resulting in the deaths of more than 900 Ottoman soldiers as well as 2 bimbashis and a dozen officers, whereas the Albanians suffered only 170 dead or wounded. Shakir Pasha was thereby ordered to stand down.

Sulejman Aga Botusha was a prominent local leader and patriotic resistance fighter, and had worked with Isa Boletini as a protector of Albanian interests and rights, as well as a leader of the local movements for independence and resistance against the Ottomans.

During the First Balkan War, Bajram Curri and his small force managed to push the Serbs across Morina Pass (Qafa e Morinës), and his troops entered the villages of Botushë, Molliq and Ponoshec. They could not continue as Radomir Vešović would reinforce the Serbs with 12,000 new troops in order to subdue the region with numeric superiority. Azem Galica's band of resistance fighters passed through Botushë and Glloxhan in order to get to the Highlands of Gjakova. Botushë was part of the Neutral Zone of Junik.

Botushë has been the home of many Albanian resistance fighters, such as the aforementioned Sulejman Aga Botusha, Jashar Salihu – a Hero of Kosovo recipient and martyr of the Kosovo War – and Islam Aga. Islam Aga was a noteworthy fighter of the League of Prizren who was one of the leaders of the force that killed Mehmed Ali Pasha at Abdullah Pashë Dreni's kulla. Islam Aga slew 28 Turks before being killed by cannon fire in his final battle.

Kosovo War 
During the Kosovo War, the village was severely affected. 159 out of a total of 179 houses were completely destroyed by Serbian forces. The local mosque was also damaged and destroyed. There is a plaque for those who lost their lives during that period within the village, and it includes names, pictures and the date of their deaths. The inscription on the plaque reads:

Notable figures 
 Jashar Salihu – Hero of Kosovo recipient, Albanian diplomat, activist and general.
 Islam Aga – League of Prizren fighter, distinguished for his courage, slew 28 Turks in battle before being killed by cannon fire.
 Sulejman Agë Botusha – Albanian patriot, renowned resistance fighter, prominent local leader. Resistance leader in the battle of February 12, 1904 between Ottoman forces and Albanian resistance fighters.

Notes

References

Sources

External links 
 https://www.facebook.com/botusha.li/?ref=page_internal
 https://www.botusha.li/

Villages in Gjakova